Emmenosperma alphitonioides, the yellow ash or bonewood, is a rainforest tree of eastern Australia. It grows from Clyde River, New South Wales near Batemans Bay (35° S), to Cape York Peninsula in at the most northerly part of Australia. It grows in many different types of rainforest, in tropical, sub tropical and warm temperate rainforests.

Description
The outer bark is fissured, silvery grey. The fissures become more evident on larger trees. The trunk is somewhat flanged at the base.

Lower leaf surface paler than the top side. Leaf veins evident on both sides.

White flowers appear between August and November, in cymes of panicles. The fruit is a bright orange and fleshy, with two seeds. Fruit matures from March to August. When fruiting, the tree is easily identified by masses of orange drupes. The use of a file is recommended to weaken the seed shell, to assist germination.

References

 Floyd, A.G., Rainforest Trees of Mainland South-eastern Australia, Inkata Press 1989, 

Rhamnaceae
Rosales of Australia
Trees of Australia
Flora of Queensland
Flora of New South Wales
Taxa named by Ferdinand von Mueller